Psychopath is a 1968 film directed by . The film is about Sigpress (Francisco Martinez Celeiro), a thief who steals jewels which he then returns to the owners in order to collect money as a reward. He is being tracked by Scotland Yard when he learns that the gem called the Eye of Allah is being escorted from London to Paris. On attempting to steal the jewel, he finds it's a fake which leads to his own investigation.

Cast
 George Martin as Sigpress
 Ingrid Schoeller as Marielle
 Karin Field as Priscilla, Niorkos Frau
 Paolo Carlini as Inspektor Bennet
 Andrea Aureli as Thamistokles Niorkos
 Gloria Paul as Nachtclubtänzerin
 Aldo Canti as Pedro (as Nick Jordan)
 Klaus Kinski as Periwinkle
 Artemio Antonini
 Giorgio Bixio

Production
It is actually written by Riso and an uncredited Enzo Gicca Palli. Werner Hauff and Zurli are also credited as co-writers but accordingly to Zurli, their presence was nominal and only added per co-production needs.

Guido Zurli was aware of cast member Klaus Kinski's behavior on set, and devised a plan to keep him behaved. When becoming aware that he was approaching the set, Zurli began acting mad by throwing way the script, yelling and kicking floodlights. This was a plan to have Kinski believe that he was even more outrageous than he could be.

The film was shot in Rome, London and Paris.

ReleasePsychopath was released in Italy on 15 April 1968. It was shown in Germany on 25 April 1969. In Germany a novelization of the film was written by Mike Widborg (Peter Leukefeld) and published by Moewig under the title Mister 10%'' in 1969.

Reception
Italian film historian and critic Roberto Curti found the film as "ultimately quite enjoyable" and that it "has an ironic punch with most of its contemporaries lacked"

See also
 Klaus Kinski filmography
 List of Italian films of 1968
 List of German films of the 1960s

References

Footnotes

Sources

External links

1968 films
1968 crime films
1960s German-language films
Italian crime films
German crime films
West German films
Films shot in London
Films shot in Rome
Films shot in Paris
1960s Italian films
1960s German films